

Peerage of England, Scotland and Great Britain

Dukes

|colspan=5 style="background: #fcc" align="center"|Peerage of England
|-
|rowspan=2|Duke of Cornwall (1337)||none||1702||1714||
|-
|Prince George, Prince of Wales||1714||1727||
|-
|Duke of Norfolk (1483)||Thomas Howard, 8th Duke of Norfolk||1701||1732||
|-
|Duke of Somerset (1547)||Charles Seymour, 6th Duke of Somerset||1678||1748||
|-
|rowspan=2|Duke of Cleveland (1670)||Barbara Palmer, 1st Duchess of Cleveland||1670||1709||Died
|-
|Charles FitzRoy, 2nd Duke of Cleveland||1709||1730||
|-
|Duke of Portsmouth (1673)||Louise de Kérouaille, Duchess of Portsmouth||1673||1734||
|-
|Duke of Richmond (1675)||Charles Lennox, 1st Duke of Richmond||1675||1723||
|-
|Duke of Southampton (1675)||Charles Fitzroy, 1st Duke of Southampton||1675||1730||Succeeded to the more senior Dukedom of Cleveland, see above
|-
|Duke of Grafton (1675)||Charles FitzRoy, 2nd Duke of Grafton||1690||1757||
|-
|Duke of Ormonde (1682)||James Butler, 2nd Duke of Ormonde||1688||1715||Attainted and his honours were forfeited; the attainder was reversed in 1871
|-
|rowspan=2|Duke of Beaufort (1682)||Henry Somerset, 2nd Duke of Beaufort||1700||1714||Died
|-
|Henry Scudamore, 3rd Duke of Beaufort||1714||1745||
|-
|Duke of Northumberland (1683)||George FitzRoy, 1st Duke of Northumberland||1683||1716||Died, title extinct
|-
|Duke of St Albans (1684)||Charles Beauclerk, 1st Duke of St Albans||1684||1726||
|-
|Duke of Cumberland (1689)||Prince George, Duke of Cumberland||1689||1708||Died, title extinct
|-
|Duke of Bolton (1689)||Charles Paulet, 2nd Duke of Bolton||1699||1722||
|-
|Duke of Schomberg (1689)||Meinhardt Schomberg, 3rd Duke of Schomberg||1693||1719||Died, title extinct
|-
|Duke of Shrewsbury (1694)||Charles Talbot, 1st Duke of Shrewsbury||1694||1718||Died, title extinct
|-
|rowspan=2|Duke of Leeds (1694)||Thomas Osborne, 1st Duke of Leeds||1694||1712||Died
|-
|Peregrine Osborne, 2nd Duke of Leeds||1712||1729||
|-
|rowspan=2|Duke of Bedford (1694)||Wriothesley Russell, 2nd Duke of Bedford||1700||1711||Died
|-
|Wriothesley Russell, 3rd Duke of Bedford||1711||1732||
|-
|rowspan=2|Duke of Devonshire (1694)||William Cavendish, 1st Duke of Devonshire||1694||1707||Died
|-
|William Cavendish, 2nd Duke of Devonshire||1707||1729||
|-
|Duke of Newcastle-upon-Tyne (1694)||John Holles, 1st Duke of Newcastle-upon-Tyne||1694||1711||Died, title extinct
|-
|Duke of Marlborough (1702)||John Churchill, 1st Duke of Marlborough||1702||1722||
|-
|Duke of Buckingham and Normanby (1703)||John Sheffield, 1st Duke of Buckingham and Normanby||1703||1721||
|-
|rowspan=2|Duke of Rutland (1703)||John Manners, 1st Duke of Rutland||1703||1711||Died
|-
|John Manners, 2nd Duke of Rutland||1711||1721||
|-
|rowspan=2|Duke of Montagu (1705)||Ralph Montagu, 1st Duke of Montagu||1705||1709||Died
|-
|John Montagu, 2nd Duke of Montagu||1709||1749||
|-
|Duke of Cambridge (1706)||Prince George, Duke of Cambridge||1706||1727||Became Duke of Cornwall, see above
|-
|colspan=5 style="background: #fcc" align="center"|Peerage of Scotland
|-
|rowspan=2|Duke of Hamilton (1643)||James Hamilton, 4th Duke of Hamilton||1698||1712||Created Duke of Brandon in 1710; died
|-
|James Hamilton, 5th Duke of Hamilton||1712||1743||
|-
|Duke of Buccleuch (1663)||Anne Scott, 1st Duchess of Buccleuch||1663||1732||
|-
|rowspan=2|Duke of Queensberry (1684)||James Douglas, 2nd Duke of Queensberry||1695||1711||Created Duke of Dover in 1708; died
|-
|Charles Douglas, 3rd Duke of Queensberry||1711||1778||
|-
|rowspan=2|Duke of Gordon (1684)||George Gordon, 1st Duke of Gordon||1684||1716||Died
|-
|Alexander Gordon, 2nd Duke of Gordon||1716||1728||
|-
|Duke of Argyll (1701)||John Campbell, 2nd Duke of Argyll||1703||1743||Created Duke of Greenwich in 1719
|-
|Duke of Atholl (1703)||John Murray, 1st Duke of Atholl||1703||1724||
|-
|Duke of Douglas (1703)||Archibald Douglas, 1st Duke of Douglas||1703||1761||
|-
|Duke of Montrose (1707)||James Graham, 1st Duke of Montrose||1707||1742||
|-
|Duke of Roxburghe (1707)||John Ker, 1st Duke of Roxburghe||1707||1741||
|-
|colspan=5 style="background: #fcc" align="center"|Peerage of Great Britain
|-
|Duke of Kent (1710)||Henry Grey, 1st Duke of Kent||1710||1740||New creation
|-
|Duke of Ancaster and Kesteven (1715)||Robert Bertie, 1st Duke of Ancaster and Kesteven||1715||1723||New creation
|-
|Duke of Kingston-upon-Hull (1715)||Evelyn Pierrepont, 1st Duke of Kingston-upon-Hull||1715||1726||New creation
|-
|Duke of Newcastle upon Tyne (1715)||Thomas Pelham-Holles, 1st Duke of Newcastle||1715||1768||New creation
|-
|Duke of York and Albany (1716)||Ernest Augustus, Duke of York and Albany||1716||1728||New creation
|-
|Duke of Portland (1716)||Henry Bentinck, 1st Duke of Portland||1716||1726||New creation
|-
|Duke of Wharton (1716)||Philip Wharton, 1st Duke of Wharton||1718||1729||New creation
|-
|Duchess of Kendal (1719)||Melusine von der Schulenburg, Duchess of Kendal||1719||1743||New creation
|-
|Duke of Manchester (1719)||Charles Montagu, 1st Duke of Manchester||1719||1722||New creation
|-
|Duke of Chandos (1719)||James Brydges, 1st Duke of Chandos||1719||1744||New creation
|-
|}

Marquesses

|colspan=5 style="background: #fcc" align="center"|Peerage of England
|-
|Marquess of Powis (1687)||William Herbert, 2nd Marquess of Powis||1696||1745||
|-
|Marquess of Kent (1706)||Henry Grey, 1st Marquess of Kent||1706||1740||Created Duke of Kent, see above
|-
|Marquess of Lindsey (1706)||Robert Bertie, 1st Marquess of Lindsey||1706||1723||Created Duke of Ancaster and Kesteven, see above
|-
|Marquess of Dorchester (1706)||Evelyn Pierrepont, 1st Marquess of Dorchester||1706||1726||Created Duke of Kingston-upon-Hull, see above
|-
|colspan=5 style="background: #fcc" align="center"|Peerage of Scotland
|-
|rowspan=3|Marquess of Tweeddale (1694)||John Hay, 2nd Marquess of Tweeddale||1697||1713||Died
|-
|Charles Hay, 3rd Marquess of Tweeddale||1713||1715||Died
|-
|John Hay, 4th Marquess of Tweeddale||1715||1762||
|-
|Marquess of Lothian (1701)||William Kerr, 2nd Marquess of Lothian||1703||1722||
|-
|Marquess of Annandale (1701)||William Johnstone, 1st Marquess of Annandale||1701||1721||
|-
|colspan=5 style="background: #fcc" align="center"|Peerage of Great Britain
|-
|rowspan=2|Marquess of Wharton (1715)||Thomas Wharton, 1st Marquess of Wharton||1715||1715||New creation, died
|-
|Philip Wharton, 2nd Marquess of Wharton||1715||1729||Created Duke of Wharton, see above
|-
|}

Earls

|colspan=5 style="background: #fcc" align="center"|Peerage of England
|-
|Earl of Shrewsbury (1442)||Gilbert Talbot, 13th Earl of Shrewsbury||1718||1743||Earldom previously held by the Duke of Shrewsbury
|-
|Earl of Derby (1485)||James Stanley, 10th Earl of Derby||1702||1736||
|-
|Earl of Huntingdon (1529)||Theophilus Hastings, 9th Earl of Huntingdon||1705||1746||
|-
|Earl of Pembroke (1551)||Thomas Herbert, 8th Earl of Pembroke||1683||1733||
|-
|Earl of Devon (1553)||William Courtenay, de jure 6th Earl of Devon||1702||1735||
|-
|Earl of Lincoln (1572)||Henry Clinton, 7th Earl of Lincoln||1693||1728||
|-
|rowspan=3|Earl of Suffolk (1603)||Henry Howard, 5th Earl of Suffolk||1691||1709||Died
|-
|Henry Howard, 6th Earl of Suffolk||1709||1718||Died
|-
|Charles Howard, 7th Earl of Suffolk||1718||1722||
|-
|Earl of Dorset (1604)||Lionel Sackville, 7th Earl of Dorset||1706||1765||
|-
|Earl of Exeter (1605)||John Cecil, 6th Earl of Exeter||1700||1721||
|-
|Earl of Salisbury (1605)||James Cecil, 5th Earl of Salisbury||1694||1728||
|-
|Earl of Bridgewater (1617)||Scroop Egerton, 4th Earl of Bridgewater||1701||1744||
|-
|Earl of Northampton (1618)||George Compton, 4th Earl of Northampton||1681||1727||
|-
|Earl of Leicester (1618)||John Sidney, 6th Earl of Leicester||1705||1737||
|-
|Earl of Warwick (1618)||Edward Rich, 7th Earl of Warwick||1702||1721||
|-
|rowspan="2"|Earl of Denbigh (1622)||Basil Feilding, 4th Earl of Denbigh||1685||1717||Died
|-
|William Feilding, 5th Earl of Denbigh||1717||1755||
|-
|Earl of Bolingbroke (1624)||Paulet St John, 3rd Earl of Bolingbroke||1688||1711||Died, title extinct
|-
|Earl of Westmorland (1624)||Thomas Fane, 6th Earl of Westmorland||1699||1736||
|-
|Earl of Manchester (1626)||Charles Montagu, 4th Earl of Manchester||1683||1722||Created Duke of Manchester, see above
|-
|Earl of Berkshire (1626)||Henry Howard, 4th Earl of Berkshire||1706||1757||
|-
|rowspan="2"|Earl Rivers (1626)||Richard Savage, 4th Earl Rivers||1694||1712||Died
|-
|John Savage, 5th Earl Rivers||1712||1737||
|-
|Earl of Peterborough (1628)||Charles Mordaunt, 3rd Earl of Peterborough||1697||1735||
|-
|Earl of Stamford (1628)||Thomas Grey, 2nd Earl of Stamford||1673||1720||
|-
|rowspan="2"|Earl of Winchilsea (1628)||Charles Finch, 4th Earl of Winchilsea||1689||1712||Died
|-
|Heneage Finch, 5th Earl of Winchilsea||1712||1726||
|-
|Earl of Carnarvon (1628)||Charles Dormer, 2nd Earl of Carnarvon||1643||1709||Died, title extinct
|-
|rowspan="2"|Earl of Chesterfield (1628)||Philip Stanhope, 2nd Earl of Chesterfield||1656||1714||Died
|-
|Philip Stanhope, 3rd Earl of Chesterfield||1714||1726||
|-
|Earl of Thanet (1628)||Thomas Tufton, 6th Earl of Thanet||1684||1729||
|-
|Earl of Sunderland (1643)||Charles Spencer, 3rd Earl of Sunderland||1702||1722||
|-
|rowspan="2"|Earl of Scarsdale (1645)||Robert Leke, 3rd Earl of Scarsdale||1681||1707||Died
|-
|Nicholas Leke, 4th Earl of Scarsdale||1707||1736||
|-
|Earl of Sandwich (1660)||Edward Montagu, 3rd Earl of Sandwich||1688||1729||
|-
|rowspan="2"|Earl of Anglesey (1661)||John Annesley, 4th Earl of Anglesey||1702||1710||Died
|-
|Arthur Annesley, 5th Earl of Anglesey||1710||1737||
|-
|Earl of Bath (1661)||William Granville, 3rd Earl of Bath||1701||1711||Died, title extinct
|-
|Earl of Cardigan (1661)||George Brudenell, 3rd Earl of Cardigan||1703||1732||
|-
|rowspan="2"|Earl of Clarendon (1661)||Henry Hyde, 2nd Earl of Clarendon||1674||1709||Died
|-
|Edward Hyde, 3rd Earl of Clarendon||1709||1723||
|-
|rowspan="2"|Earl of Essex (1661)||Algernon Capell, 2nd Earl of Essex||1683||1710||Died
|-
|William Capell, 3rd Earl of Essex||1710||1743||
|-
|Earl of Carlisle (1661)||Charles Howard, 3rd Earl of Carlisle||1692||1738||
|-
|Earl of Ailesbury (1664)||Thomas Bruce, 2nd Earl of Ailesbury||1685||1741||
|-
|Earl of Burlington (1664)||Richard Boyle, 3rd Earl of Burlington||1704||1753||Earl of Cork in the Peerage of Ireland
|-
|Earl of Arlington (1672)||Isabella Fitzroy, 2nd Countess of Arlington||1685||1723||
|-
|rowspan="2"|Earl of Shaftesbury (1672)||Anthony Ashley-Cooper, 3rd Earl of Shaftesbury||1699||1713||Died
|-
|Anthony Ashley Cooper, 4th Earl of Shaftesbury||1713||1771||
|-
|rowspan="2"|Earl of Lichfield (1674)||Edward Lee, 1st Earl of Lichfield||1674||1716||Died
|-
|George Lee, 2nd Earl of Lichfield||1716||1742||
|-
|Earl of Sussex (1674)||Thomas Lennard, 1st Earl of Sussex||1674||1715||Died, title extinct
|-
|Earl of Feversham (1676)||Louis de Duras, 2nd Earl of Feversham||1677||1709||Died, title extinct
|-
|Earl of Radnor (1679)||Charles Robartes, 2nd Earl of Radnor||1685||1723||
|-
|Earl of Yarmouth (1679)||William Paston, 2nd Earl of Yarmouth||1683||1732||
|-
|rowspan="2"|Earl of Berkeley (1679)||Charles Berkeley, 2nd Earl of Berkeley||1698||1710||Died
|-
|James Berkeley, 3rd Earl of Berkeley||1710||1736||
|-
|Earl of Nottingham (1681)||Daniel Finch, 2nd Earl of Nottingham||1682||1730||
|-
|rowspan="2"|Earl of Rochester (1682)||Laurence Hyde, 1st Earl of Rochester||1682||1711||Died
|-
|Henry Hyde, 2nd Earl of Rochester||1711||1753||
|-
|Earl of Abingdon (1682)||Montagu Venables-Bertie, 2nd Earl of Abingdon||1699||1743||
|-
|rowspan="2"|Earl of Gainsborough (1682)||Baptist Noel, 3rd Earl of Gainsborough||1690||1714||Died
|-
|Baptist Noel, 4th Earl of Gainsborough||1714||1751||
|-
|Earl of Plymouth (1682)||Other Windsor, 2nd Earl of Plymouth||1687||1727||
|-
|Earl of Holderness (1682)||Robert Darcy, 3rd Earl of Holderness||1692||1721||
|-
|Earl of Dorchester (1686)||Catherine Sedley, Countess of Dorchester||1686||1717||Died, title extinct
|-
|Earl of Derwentwater (1688)||James Radclyffe, 3rd Earl of Derwentwater||1705||1716||Title forfeit
|-
|rowspan="2"|Earl of Stafford (1688)||Henry Stafford Howard, 1st Earl of Stafford||1688||1719||Died
|-
|William Stafford-Howard, 2nd Earl of Stafford||1719||1734||
|-
|rowspan="2"|Earl of Portland (1689)||William Bentinck, 1st Earl of Portland||1689||1709||Died
|-
|Henry Bentinck, 2nd Earl of Portland||1709||1726||Created Duke of Portland, see above
|-
|Earl of Torrington (1689)||Arthur Herbert, 1st Earl of Torrington||1689||1716||Died, title extinct
|-
|Earl of Warrington (1690)||George Booth, 2nd Earl of Warrington||1694||1758||
|-
|Earl of Scarbrough (1690)||Richard Lumley, 1st Earl of Scarbrough||1690||1721||
|-
|rowspan="2"|Earl of Bradford (1694)||Francis Newport, 1st Earl of Bradford||1694||1708||Died
|-
|Richard Newport, 2nd Earl of Bradford||1708||1723||
|-
|rowspan="3"|Earl of Rochford (1695)||William Nassau de Zuylestein, 1st Earl of Rochford||1695||1708||
|-
|William Nassau de Zuylestein, 2nd Earl of Rochford||1709||1710||Died
|-
|Frederick Nassau de Zuylestein, 3rd Earl of Rochford||1710||1738||
|-
|rowspan="2"|Earl of Albemarle (1697)||Arnold van Keppel, 1st Earl of Albemarle||1697||1718||Died
|-
|Willem van Keppel, 2nd Earl of Albemarle||1718||1754||
|-
|rowspan="4"|Earl of Coventry (1697)||Thomas Coventry, 2nd Earl of Coventry||1699||1710||Died
|-
|Thomas Coventry, 3rd Earl of Coventry||1710||1712||Died
|-
|Gilbert Coventry, 4th Earl of Coventry||1712||1719||Died
|-
|William Coventry, 5th Earl of Coventry||1719||1751||
|-
|Earl of Orford (1697)||Edward Russell, 1st Earl of Orford||1697||1727||
|-
|rowspan="2"|Earl of Jersey (1697)||Edward Villiers, 1st Earl of Jersey||1697||1711||Died
|-
|William Villiers, 2nd Earl of Jersey||1711||1721||
|-
|Earl of Grantham (1698)||Henry de Nassau d'Auverquerque, 1st Earl of Grantham||1698||1754||
|-
|Earl of Wharton (1706)||Thomas Wharton, 1st Earl of Wharton||1706||1715||Created Marquess of Wharton, see above
|-
|Earl Poulett (1706)||John Poulett, 1st Earl Poulett||1706||1743||
|-
|rowspan="2"|Earl of Godolphin (1706)||Sidney Godolphin, 1st Earl of Godolphin||1706||1712||Died
|-
|Francis Godolphin, 2nd Earl of Godolphin||1712||1766||
|-
|Earl of Cholmondeley (1706)||Hugh Cholmondeley, 1st Earl of Cholmondeley||1706||1725||
|-
|Earl of Bindon (1706)||Henry Howard, 1st Earl of Bindon||1706||1718||Succeeded to the more senior Earldom of Suffolk, see above
|-
|colspan=5 style="background: #fcc" align="center"|Peerage of Scotland
|-
|rowspan=2|Earl of Crawford (1398)||John Lindsay, 19th Earl of Crawford||1698||1713||Died
|-
|John Lindsay, 20th Earl of Crawford||1713||1749||
|-
|rowspan=2|Earl of Erroll (1452)||Charles Hay, 13th Earl of Erroll||1704||1717||Died
|-
|Mary Hay, 14th Countess of Erroll||1717||1758||
|-
|rowspan=2|Earl Marischal (1458)||William Keith, 9th Earl Marischal||1694||1712||Died
|-
|George Keith, 10th Earl Marischal||1712||1715||Title forfeited
|-
|Earl of Sutherland (1235)||John Gordon, 16th Earl of Sutherland||1703||1733||
|-
|Earl of Mar (1114)||John Erskine, Earl of Mar||1689||1716||Attainted
|-
|Earl of Rothes (1458)||John Hamilton-Leslie, 9th Earl of Rothes||1700||1722||
|-
|rowspan=2|Earl of Morton (1458)||James Douglas, 11th Earl of Morton||1686||1715||Died
|-
|Robert Douglas, 12th Earl of Morton||1715||1730||
|-
|Earl of Glencairn (1488)||William Cunningham, 12th Earl of Glencairn||1703||1734||
|-
|Earl of Eglinton (1507)||Alexander Montgomerie, 9th Earl of Eglinton||1701||1729||
|-
|Earl of Cassilis (1509)||John Kennedy, 8th Earl of Cassilis||1701||1759||
|-
|Earl of Caithness (1455)||Alexander Sinclair, 9th Earl of Caithness||1705||1765||
|-
|Earl of Buchan (1469)||David Erskine, 9th Earl of Buchan||1695||1745||
|-
|Earl of Moray (1562)||Charles Stuart, 6th Earl of Moray||1701||1735||
|-
|Earl of Linlithgow (1600)||James Livingston, 5th Earl of Linlithgow||1695||1716||Attainted 
|-
|Earl of Winton (1600)||George Seton, 5th Earl of Winton||1704||1716||Peerage forfeited
|-
|Earl of Home (1605)||Alexander Home, 7th Earl of Home||1706||1720||
|-
|Earl of Perth (1605)||James Drummond, 4th Earl of Perth||1675||1716||Attainted
|-
|Earl of Wigtown (1606)||John Fleming, 6th Earl of Wigtown||1681||1744||
|-
|Earl of Abercorn (1606)||James Hamilton, 6th Earl of Abercorn||1701||1734||
|-
|rowspan=3|Earl of Strathmore and Kinghorne (1606)||John Lyon, 4th Earl of Strathmore and Kinghorne||1695||1712||Died
|-
|John Lyon, 5th Earl of Strathmore and Kinghorne||1712||1715||Died
|-
|Charles Lyon, 6th Earl of Strathmore and Kinghorne||1715||1728||
|-
|rowspan=2|Earl of Kellie (1619)||Alexander Erskine, 4th Earl of Kellie||1677||1710||Died
|-
|Alexander Erskine, 5th Earl of Kellie||1710||1758||
|-
|Earl of Haddington (1619)||Thomas Hamilton, 6th Earl of Haddington||1685||1735||
|-
|Earl of Nithsdale (1620)||William Maxwell, 5th Earl of Nithsdale||1696||1716||Attainted 
|-
|Earl of Galloway (1623)||James Stewart, 5th Earl of Galloway||1694||1746||
|-
|Earl of Seaforth (1623)||William Mackenzie, 5th Earl of Seaforth||1701||1716||Title forfeited 
|-
|rowspan=2|Earl of Lauderdale (1624)||John Maitland, 5th Earl of Lauderdale||1695||1710||Died
|-
|Charles Maitland, 6th Earl of Lauderdale||1710||1744||
|-
|Earl of Loudoun (1633)||Hugh Campbell, 3rd Earl of Loudoun||1684||1731||
|-
|rowspan=3|Earl of Kinnoull (1633)||William Hay, 6th Earl of Kinnoull||1687||1709||Died
|-
|Thomas Hay, 7th Earl of Kinnoull||1709||1719||Died
|-
|George Hay, 8th Earl of Kinnoull||1709||1758||
|-
|Earl of Dumfries (1633)||Penelope Crichton, 4th Countess of Dumfries||1694||1742||
|-
|Earl of Stirling (1633)||Henry Alexander, 5th Earl of Stirling||1691||1739||
|-
|Earl of Southesk (1633)||James Carnegie, 5th Earl of Southesk||1699||1716||Attainted
|-
|Earl of Traquair (1633)||Charles Stewart, 4th Earl of Traquair||1673||1741||
|-
|Earl of Wemyss (1633)||David Wemyss, 4th Earl of Wemyss||1705||1720||
|-
|rowspan=2|Earl of Dalhousie (1633)||William Ramsay, 5th Earl of Dalhousie||1696||1710||Died
|-
|William Ramsay, 6th Earl of Dalhousie||1710||1739||
|-
|rowspan=2|Earl of Findlater (1638)||James Ogilvy, 3rd Earl of Findlater||1658||1711||Died
|-
|James Ogilvy, 4th Earl of Findlater||1711||1730||
|-
|Earl of Airlie (1639)||David Ogilvy, 3rd Earl of Airlie||1703||1717||Died, his heir was under attainder
|-
|Earl of Carnwath (1639)||Robert Dalzell, 5th Earl of Carnwath||1683||1716||Attainted
|-
|Earl of Callendar (1641)||James Livingston, 4th Earl of Callendar||1692||1716||Attainted 
|-
|Earl of Leven (1641)||David Leslie, 3rd Earl of Leven||1676||1728||
|-
|Earl of Dysart (1643)||Lionel Tollemache, 3rd Earl of Dysart||1698||1727||
|-
|Earl of Panmure (1646)||James Maule, 4th Earl of Panmure||1686||1716||Peerage forfeited 
|-
|Earl of Selkirk (1646)||Charles Douglas, 2nd Earl of Selkirk||1694||1739||
|-
|Earl of Northesk (1647)||David Carnegie, 4th Earl of Northesk||1688||1729||
|-
|rowspan=2|Earl of Kincardine (1647)||Robert Bruce, 5th Earl of Kincardine||1706||1718||Died
|-
|Alexander Bruce, 6th Earl of Kincardine||1718||1721||
|-
|Earl of Balcarres (1651)||Colin Lindsay, 3rd Earl of Balcarres||1662||1722||
|-
|Earl of Aboyne (1660)||John Gordon, 3rd Earl of Aboyne||1702||1732||
|-
|Earl of Newburgh (1660)||Charles Livingston, 2nd Earl of Newburgh||1670||1755||
|-
|rowspan=2|Earl of Kilmarnock (1661)||William Boyd, 3rd Earl of Kilmarnock||1692||1717||Died
|-
|William Boyd, 4th Earl of Kilmarnock||1717||1746||
|-
|rowspan=2|Earl of Forfar (1661)||Archibald Douglas, 1st Earl of Forfar||1661||1712||Died
|-
|Archibald Douglas, 2nd Earl of Forfar||1712||1715||Died, title extinct
|-
|Earl of Dundonald (1669)||John Cochrane, 4th Earl of Dundonald||1705||1720||
|-
|Earl of Dumbarton (1675)||George Douglas, 2nd Earl of Dumbarton||1692||1749||
|-
|rowspan=3|Earl of Kintore (1677)||John Keith, 1st Earl of Kintore||1677||1714||Died
|-
|William Keith, 2nd Earl of Kintore||1714||1718||Died
|-
|John Keith, 3rd Earl of Kintore||1718||1758||
|-
|rowspan=2|Earl of Breadalbane and Holland (1677)||John Campbell, 1st Earl of Breadalbane and Holland||1677||1717||Died
|-
|John Campbell, 2nd Earl of Breadalbane and Holland||1717||1752||
|-
|Earl of Aberdeen (1682)||George Gordon, 1st Earl of Aberdeen||1682||1720||
|-
|rowspan=2|Earl of Dunmore (1686)||Charles Murray, 1st Earl of Dunmore||1686||1710||Died
|-
|John Murray, 2nd Earl of Dunmore||1710||1752||
|-
|Earl of Melville (1690)||George Melville, 1st Earl of Melville||1690||1707||Died, title succeeded by the Earl of Leven, see above
|-
|Earl of Orkney (1696)||George Hamilton, 1st Earl of Orkney||1696||1737||
|-
|Earl of Ruglen (1697)||John Hamilton, 1st Earl of Ruglen||1697||1744||
|-
|Earl of March (1697)||William Douglas, 2nd Earl of March||1705||1731||
|-
|Earl of Marchmont (1697)||Patrick Hume, 1st Earl of Marchmont||1697||1724||
|-
|Earl of Seafield (1701)||James Ogilvy, 1st Earl of Seafield||1701||1730||Succeeded to the Earldom of Findlater, see above
|-
|rowspan=2|Earl of Hyndford (1701)||John Carmichael, 1st Earl of Hyndford||1701||1710||Died
|-
|James Carmichael, 2nd Earl of Hyndford||1710||1737||
|-
|rowspan=2|Earl of Cromartie (1703)||George Mackenzie, 1st Earl of Cromartie||1703||1714||Died
|-
|John Mackenzie, 2nd Earl of Cromartie||1714||1731||
|-
|Earl of Stair (1703)||John Dalrymple, 2nd Earl of Stair||1707||1747||
|-
|Earl of Rosebery (1703)||Archibald Primrose, 1st Earl of Rosebery||1703||1723||
|-
|Earl of Glasgow (1703)||David Boyle, 1st Earl of Glasgow||1703||1733||
|-
|Earl of Portmore (1703)||David Colyear, 1st Earl of Portmore||1703||1730||
|-
|rowspan=2|Earl of Bute (1703)||James Stuart, 1st Earl of Bute||1703||1710||Died
|-
|James Stuart, 2nd Earl of Bute||1710||1723||
|-
|Earl of Hopetoun (1703)||Charles Hope, 1st Earl of Hopetoun||1703||1742||
|-
|Earl of Deloraine (1706)||Henry Scott, 1st Earl of Deloraine||1706||1730||
|-
|Earl of Solway (1706)||Charles Douglas, 1st Earl of Solway||1706||1778||Succeeded to the Dukedom of Queensberry, see above
|-
|Earl of Ilay (1706)||Archibald Campbell, 1st Earl of Ilay||1706||1761||
|-
|colspan=5 style="background: #fcc" align="center"|Peerage of Great Britain
|-
|Earl of Oxford and Mortimer (1711)||Robert Harley, 1st Earl of Oxford and Earl Mortimer||1711||1724||New creation
|-
|Earl of Strafford (1711)||Thomas Wentworth, 1st Earl of Strafford||1711||1739||New creation
|-
|rowspan=2|Earl Ferrers (1711)||Robert Shirley, 1st Earl Ferrers||1711||1717||New creation; died
|-
|Washington Shirley, 2nd Earl Ferrers||1711||1729||
|-
|Earl of Dartmouth (1711)||William Legge, 1st Earl of Dartmouth||1711||1750||New creation
|-
|Earl of Tankerville (1714)||Charles Bennet, 1st Earl of Tankerville||1714||1722||New creation
|-
|rowspan=2|Earl of Aylesford (1714)||Heneage Finch, 1st Earl of Aylesford||1714||1740||New creation; died
|-
|Heneage Finch, 2nd Earl of Aylesford||1740||1757||
|-
|Earl of Bristol (1714)||John Hervey, 1st Earl of Bristol||1714||1751||New creation
|-
|Earl of Carnarvon (1714)||James Brydges, 1st Earl of Carnarvon||1714||1744||New creation; created Duke of Chandos, see above
|-
|Earl of Rockingham (1714)||Lewis Watson, 1st Earl of Rockingham||1740||1724||New creation
|-
|Earl of Uxbridge (1714)||Henry Paget, 1st Earl of Uxbridge||1714||1743||New creation
|-
|Earl of Halifax (1714)||Charles Montagu, 1st Earl of Halifax||1714||1715||New creation; died, peerage extinct
|-
|Earl Granville (1715)||Grace Carteret, 1st Countess Granville||1715||1744||New creation
|-
|Earl of Halifax (1715)||George Montagu, 1st Earl of Halifax||1715||1739||New creation
|-
|Earl of Sussex (1717)||Talbot Yelverton, 1st Earl of Sussex||1717||1731||New creation
|-
|Earl Cowper (1718)||William Cowper, 1st Earl Cowper||1718||1723||New creation
|-
|Earl Stanhope (1718)||James Stanhope, 1st Earl Stanhope||1740||1721||New creation
|-
|Earl Cadogan (1718)||William Cadogan, 1st Earl Cadogan||1718||1726||New creation
|-
|Earl Coningsby (1719)||Thomas Coningsby, 1st Earl Coningsby||1719||1729||New creation
|-
|Earl of Harborough (1719)||Bennet Sherard, 1st Earl of Harborough||1719||1732||New creation
|-
|}

Viscounts

|colspan=5 style="background: #fcc" align="center"|Peerage of England
|-
|Viscount Hereford (1550)||Price Devereux, 9th Viscount Hereford||1700||1740||
|-
|rowspan="3"|Viscount Montagu (1554)||Francis Browne, 4th Viscount Montagu||1682||1708||Died
|-
|Henry Browne, 5th Viscount Montagu||1708||1717||Died
|-
|Anthony Browne, 6th Viscount Montagu||1717||1767||
|-
|rowspan="2"|Viscount Saye and Sele (1624)||Nathaniel Fiennes, 4th Viscount Saye and Sele||1698||1710||Died
|-
|Laurence Fiennes, 5th Viscount Saye and Sele||1710||1742||
|-
|rowspan="2"|Viscount Fauconberg (1643)||Thomas Belasyse, 3rd Viscount Fauconberg||1700||1718||Died
|-
|Thomas Belasyse, 4th Viscount Fauconberg||1718||1774||
|-
|Viscount Hatton (1682)||William Seton Hatton, 2nd Viscount Hatton||1706||1760||
|-
|Viscount Townshend (1682)||Charles Townshend, 2nd Viscount Townshend||1687||1738||
|-
|rowspan="2"|Viscount Weymouth (1682)||Thomas Thynne, 1st Viscount Weymouth||1682||1714||Died
|-
|Thomas Thynne, 2nd Viscount Weymouth||1714||1751||
|-
|Viscount de Longueville (1690)||Talbot Yelverton, 2nd Viscount de Longueville||1704||1731||Created Earl of Sussex, see above
|-
|rowspan="2"|Viscount Lonsdale (1690)||Richard Lowther, 2nd Viscount Lonsdale||1700||1713||Died
|-
|Henry Lowther, 3rd Viscount Lonsdale||1713||1751||
|-
|colspan=5 style="background: #fcc" align="center"|Peerage of Scotland
|-
|Viscount of Falkland (1620)||Lucius Cary, 6th Viscount of Falkland||1694||1730||
|-
|rowspan=2|Viscount of Dunbar (1620)||Robert Constable, 3rd Viscount of Dunbar||1668||1714||Died
|-
|William Constable, 4th Viscount of Dunbar||1714||1718||Died; Peerage dormant
|-
|Viscount of Stormont (1621)||David Murray, 5th Viscount of Stormont||1668||1731||
|-
|Viscount of Kenmure (1633)||William Gordon, 6th Viscount of Kenmure||1698||1715||Attainted
|-
|rowspan=2|Viscount of Arbuthnott (1641)||Robert Arbuthnot, 4th Viscount of Arbuthnott||1694||1710||Died
|-
|John Arbuthnot, 5th Viscount of Arbuthnott||1710||1756||
|-
|rowspan=2|Viscount of Kingston (1651)||Archibald Seton, 2nd Viscount of Kingston||1691||1713||Died
|-
|James Seton, 3rd Viscount of Kingston||1713||1715||Attainted
|-
|rowspan=2|Viscount of Irvine (1661)||Edward Machel Ingram, 4th Viscount of Irvine||1702||1714||Died
|-
|Rich Ingram, 5th Viscount of Irvine||1714||1721||
|-
|Viscount of Kilsyth (1661)||William Livingston, 3rd Viscount of Kilsyth||1706||1716||Attainted
|-
|rowspan=2|Viscount Preston (1681)||Edward Graham, 2nd Viscount Preston||1695||1710||Died
|-
|Charles Graham, 3rd Viscount Preston||1710||1739||
|-
|Viscount of Newhaven (1681)||William Cheyne, 2nd Viscount Newhaven||1698||1728||
|-
|rowspan=2|Viscount of Strathallan (1686)||William Drummond, 3rd Viscount Strathallan||1702||1711||Died
|-
|William Drummond, 4th Viscount Strathallan||1711||1746||
|-
|Viscount of Teviot (1696)||Thomas Livingston, 1st Viscount Teviot||1696||1711||Died; Peerage extinct
|-
|rowspan=2|Viscount of Garnock (1703)||John Lindsay-Crawford, 1st Viscount of Garnock||1703||1708||Died
|-
|Patrick Lindsay-Crawford, 2nd Viscount of Garnock||1708||1735||
|-
|rowspan=2|Viscount of Primrose (1703)||Archibald Primrose, 2nd Viscount of Primrose||1706||1716||Died
|-
|Hugh Primrose, 3rd Viscount of Primrose||1716||1741||
|-
|colspan=5 style="background: #fcc" align="center"|Peerage of Great Britain
|-
|Viscount Bolingbroke (1712)||Henry St John, 1st Viscount Bolingbroke||1712||1751||New creation
|-
|Viscount Tadcaster (1714)||Henry O'Brien, 1st Viscount Tadcaster||1714||1741||New creation
|-
|Viscount St John (1716)||Henry St John, 1st Viscount St John||1716||1742||New creation
|-
|Viscount Coningsby (1716)||Margaret Newton, 1st Viscountess Coningsby||1717||1761||New creation
|-
|Viscount Cobham (1718)||Richard Temple, 1st Viscount Cobham||1718||1749||New creation
|-
|}

Barons

|colspan=5 style="background: #fcc" align="center"|Peerage of England
|-
|Baron FitzWalter (1295)||Charles Mildmay, 18th Baron FitzWalter||1679||1728||
|- 
|rowspan="2"|Baron Ferrers of Chartley (1299)||Robert Shirley, 14th Baron Ferrers of Chartley||1677||1717||Died
|- 
|Elizabeth Compton, 15th Baroness Ferrers of Chartley||1717||1741||
|- 
|Baron Dudley (1440)||Edward Ward, 9th Baron Dudley||1704||1731||
|- 
|Baron Stourton (1448)||Edward Stourton, 13th Baron Stourton||1685||1720||
|- 
|rowspan="2"|Baron Willoughby de Broke (1491)||Richard Verney, 11th Baron Willoughby de Broke||1683||1711||Died
|- 
|George Verney, 12th Baron Willoughby de Broke||1711||1728||
|- 
|Baron Wentworth (1529)||Martha Johnson, 8th Baroness Wentworth||1697||1745||
|-
|rowspan="4"|Baron Willoughby of Parham (1547)||Hugh Willoughby, 12th Baron Willoughby of Parham||1691||1712||Died
|-
|Edward Willoughby, 13th Baron Willoughby of Parham||1712||1713||Died
|-
|Charles Willoughby, 14th Baron Willoughby of Parham||1713||1715||Died
|-
|Hugh Willoughby, 15th Baron Willoughby of Parham||1715||1765||
|-
|rowspan="2"|Baron Paget (1552)||William Paget, 6th Baron Paget||1678||1713||Died
|-
|Henry Paget, 7th Baron Paget||1713||1743||Created Earl of Uxbridge, see above
|-
|Baron North (1554)||William North, 6th Baron North||1691||1734||
|-
|Baron Howard of Effingham (1554)||Thomas Howard, 6th Baron Howard of Effingham||1695||1725||
|-
|rowspan="2"|Baron Chandos (1554)||James Brydges, 8th Baron Chandos||1676||1714||Died
|-
|James Brydges, 9th Baron Chandos||1714||1744||Created Duke of Chandos, see above
|-
|Baron Hunsdon (1559)||William Ferdinand Carey, 8th Baron Hunsdon||1702||1765||
|-
|rowspan="2"|Baron St John of Bletso (1559)||Paulet St John, 8th Baron St John of Bletso||1711||1714||Barony previously held by the Earls of Bolingbroke; died
|-
|William St John, 9th Baron St John of Bletso||1714||1720||
|-
|Baron De La Warr (1570)||John West, 6th Baron De La Warr||1687||1723||
|-
|Baron Gerard (1603)||Philip Gerard, 7th Baron Gerard||1707||1733||
|-
|rowspan="2"|Baron Petre (1603)||Robert Petre, 7th Baron Petre||1706||1713||Died
|-
|Robert Petre, 8th Baron Petre||1713||1742||
|-
|rowspan="2"|Baron Arundell of Wardour (1605)||Thomas Arundell, 4th Baron Arundell of Wardour||1694||1712||Died
|-
|Henry Arundell, 5th Baron Arundell of Wardour||1712||1726||
|-
|rowspan="2"|Baron Clifton (1608)||Edward Hyde, 9th Baron Clifton||1706||1713||Died
|-
|Theodosia Bligh, 10th Baroness Clifton||1713||1722||
|-
|rowspan="2"|Baron Dormer (1615)||Rowland Dormer, 4th Baron Dormer||1709||1712||Title previously held by the Earls of Carnarvon; died
|-
|Charles Dormer, 5th Baron Dormer||1712||1728||
|-
|Baron Teynham (1616)||Henry Roper, 8th Baron Teynham||1699||1723||
|-
|rowspan="3"|Baron Brooke (1621)||Fulke Greville, 5th Baron Brooke||1677||1710||Died
|-
|Fulke Greville, 6th Baron Brooke||1710||1711||
|-
|William Greville, 7th Baron Brooke||1711||1727||
|-
|rowspan="2"|Baron Craven (1627)||William Craven, 2nd Baron Craven||1697||1711||Died
|-
|William Craven, 3rd Baron Craven||1711||1739||
|-
|rowspan="3"|Baron Lovelace (1627)||John Lovelace, 4th Baron Lovelace||1693||1709||Died
|-
|John Lovelace, 5th Baron Lovelace||1709||1709||Died
|-
|Nevill Lovelace, 6th Baron Lovelace ||1709||1736||
|-
|rowspan="2"|Baron Strange (1628)||Henrietta Stanley, 4th Baroness Strange||1714||1718||Abeyance terminated; died
|-
|Henrietta Ashburnham, 5th Baroness Strange||1718||1732||
|-
|rowspan="2"|Baron Maynard (1628)||Banastre Maynard, 3rd Baron Maynard||1699||1718||Died
|-
|Henry Maynard, 4th Baron Maynard||1718||1742||
|-
|Baron Mohun of Okehampton (1628)||Charles Mohun, 4th Baron Mohun of Okehampton||1677||1712||Died, title extinct
|-
|Baron Raby (1641)||Thomas Wentworth, 3rd Baron Raby||1695||1739||Created Earl of Strafford, see above
|-
|rowspan="2"|Baron Leigh (1643)||Thomas Leigh, 2nd Baron Leigh||1672||1710||Died
|-
|Edward Leigh, 3rd Baron Leigh||1710||1738||
|-
|Baron Jermyn (1643)||Henry Jermyn, 3rd Baron Jermyn||1703||1708||Died, title extinct
|-
|Baron Byron (1643)||William Byron, 4th Baron Byron||1695||1736||
|-
|Baron Widdrington (1643)||William Widdrington, 4th Baron Widdrington||1695||1716||Title forfeited
|-
|rowspan="2"|Baron Colepeper (1644)||John Colepeper, 3rd Baron of Colepeper||1689||1719||Died
|-
|Cheney Colepeper, 4th Baron Colepeper||1719||1725||
|-
|Baron Rockingham (1645)||Lewis Watson, 3rd Baron Rockingham||1689||1724||Created Earl of Rockingham, see above
|-
|Baron Lexinton (1645)||Robert Sutton, 2nd Baron Lexinton||1668||1723||
|-
|rowspan="2"|Baron Langdale (1658)||Marmaduke Langdale, 3rd Baron Langdale||1703||1718||Died
|-
|Marmaduke Langdale, 4th Baron Langdale||1718||1771||
|-
|Baron Berkeley of Stratton (1658)||William Berkeley, 4th Baron Berkeley of Stratton||1697||1741||
|-
|Baron Cornwallis (1661)||Charles Cornwallis, 4th Baron Cornwallis||1698||1722||
|-
|Baron Crew (1661)||Nathaniel Crew, 3rd Baron Crew||1697||1721||
|-
|Baron Arundell of Trerice (1664)||John Arundell, 4th Baron Arundell of Trerice||1706||1768||
|-
|Baron Clifford of Chudleigh (1672)||Hugh Clifford, 2nd Baron Clifford of Chudleigh||1673||1730||
|-
|Baron Belasyse of Osgodby (1674)||Susan Belasyse, Baroness Belasyse||1674||1713||Died, title extinct
|-
|rowspan="4"|Baron Willoughby of Parham (1680)||Hugh Willoughby, 12th Baron Willoughby of Parham||1692||1712||Died
|-
|Edward Willoughby, 13th Baron Willoughby of Parham||1712||1713||Died
|-
|Charles Willoughby, 14th Baron Willoughby of Parham||1713||1715||Died
|-
|Hugh Willoughby, 15th Baron Willoughby of Parham||1715||1765||
|-
|Baron Carteret (1681)||John Carteret, 2nd Baron Carteret||1695||1763||
|-
|Baron Ossulston (1682)||Charles Bennet, 2nd Baron Ossulston||1695||1722||Created Earl of Tankerville, see above
|-
|Baron Dartmouth (1682)||William Legge, 2nd Baron Dartmouth||1691||1750||Created Earl of Dartmouth, see above
|-
|Baron Stawell (1683)||William Stawell, 3rd Baron Stawell||1692||1742||
|-
|Baron Guilford (1683)||Francis North, 2nd Baron Guilford||1685||1729||
|-
|Baron Waldegrave (1686)||James Waldegrave, 2nd Baron Waldegrave||1689||1741||
|-
|rowspan="3"|Baron Griffin (1688)||Edward Griffin, 1st Baron Griffin||1688||1710||Died
|-
|James Griffin, 2nd Baron Griffin||1710||1715||
|-
|Edward Griffin, 3rd Baron Griffin||1715||1742||
|-
|rowspan="3"|Baron Ashburnham (1689)||John Ashburnham, 1st Baron Ashburnham||1689||1710||Died
|-
|William Ashburnham, 2nd Baron Ashburnham||1710||1710||Died
|-
|John Ashburnham, 3rd Baron Ashburnham||1710||1730||
|-
|rowspan="2"|Baron Leominster (1692)||William Fermor, 1st Baron Leominster||1692||1711||Died
|-
|Thomas Fermor, 2nd Baron Leominster||1711||1753||
|-
|rowspan="2"|Baron Herbert of Chirbury (1694)||Henry Herbert, 1st Baron Herbert of Chirbury||1694||1709||Died
|-
|Henry Herbert, 2nd Baron Herbert of Chirbury||1709||1738||
|-
|Baron Bergavenny (1695)||George Nevill, 13th Baron Bergavenny||1695||1721||
|-
|rowspan="2"|Baron Haversham (1696)||John Thompson, 1st Baron Haversham||1696||1710||Died
|-
|Maurice Thompson, 2nd Baron Haversham||1710||1745||
|-
|Baron Somers (1697]||John Somers, 1st Baron Somers||1697||1716||Died, title extinct
|-
|Baron Barnard (1698)||Christopher Vane, 1st Baron Barnard||1698||1723||
|-
|rowspan="2"|Baron Halifax (1700)||Charles Montagu, 1st Baron Halifax||1700||1715||Created Earl of Halifax (1714), see above
|-
|George Montagu, 2nd Baron Halifax||1715||1739||Created Earl of Halifax (1715), see above
|-
|Baron Granville of Potheridge (1703)||John Granville, 1st Baron Granville of Potheridge||1703||1707||Died, title extinct
|-
|Baron Guernsey (1703)||Heneage Finch, 1st Baron Guernsey||1703||1719||Created Earl of Aylesford, see above
|-
|rowspan="2"|Baron Gower (1703)||John Leveson-Gower, 1st Baron Gower||1703||1709||Died
|-
|John Leveson-Gower, 2nd Baron Gower||1709||1754||
|-
|Baron Conway (1703)||Francis Seymour-Conway, 1st Baron Conway||1703||1732||
|-
|Baron Hervey (1703)||John Hervey, 1st Baron Hervey||1703||1751||Created Earl of Bristol, see above
|-
|Baron Cowper (1706)||William Cowper, 1st Baron Cowper||1706||1723||Created Earl Cowper, see above
|-
|rowspan="2"|Baron Pelham of Stanmer (1706)||Thomas Pelham, 1st Baron Pelham||1706||1712||Died
|-
|Thomas Pelham-Holles, 2nd Baron Pelham||1712||1768||Created Duke of Newcastle-upon-Tyne, see above
|-
|colspan=5 style="background: #fcc" align="center"|Peerage of Scotland
|-
|rowspan=2|Lord Somerville (1430)||James Somerville, 12th Lord Somerville||1693||1709||Died
|-
|James Somerville, 13th Lord Somerville||1709||1765||
|-
|rowspan=2|Lord Forbes (1442)||William Forbes, 12th Lord Forbes||1697||1716||Died
|-
|William Forbes, 13th Lord Forbes||1716||1730||
|-
|rowspan=2|Lord Saltoun (1445)||William Fraser, 12th Lord Saltoun||1693||1715||Died
|-
|Alexander Fraser, 13th Lord Saltoun||1715||1748||
|-
|rowspan=2|Lord Gray (1445)||Patrick Gray, 8th Lord Gray||1663||1711||Died
|-
|John Gray, 9th Lord Gray||1711||1724||
|-
|Lord Sinclair (1449)||Henry St Clair, 10th Lord Sinclair||1676||1723||
|-
|rowspan=2|Lord Oliphant (1455)||Charles Oliphant, 7th Lord Oliphant||1680||1709||Died
|-
|Patrick Oliphant, 8th Lord Oliphant||1709||1721||
|-
|rowspan=2|Lord Cathcart (1460)||Alan Cathcart, 6th Lord Cathcart||1628||1709||Died
|-
|Alan Cathcart, 7th Lord Cathcart||1709||1732||
|-
|Lord Lovat (1464)||Simon Fraser, 11th Lord Lovat||1699||1746||
|-
|rowspan=2|Lord Sempill (1489)||Francis Sempill, 10th Lord Sempill||1695||1716||Died
|-
|John Sempill, 11th Lord Sempill||1716||1727||
|-
|Lord Ross (1499)||William Ross, 12th Lord Ross||1682||1738||
|-
|rowspan=2|Lord Elphinstone (1509)||John Elphinstone, 8th Lord Elphinstone||1669||1718||Died
|-
|Charles Elphinstone, 9th Lord Elphinstone||1718||1757||
|-
|Lord Torphichen (1564)||James Sandilands, 7th Lord Torphichen||1696||1753||
|-
|rowspan=2|Lord Lindores (1600)||David Leslie, 5th Lord Lindores||1706||1719||Died
|-
|Alexander Leslie, 6th Lord Lindores||1719||1765||
|-
|rowspan=2|Lord Colville of Culross (1604)||Alexander Colville, 5th Lord Colville of Culross||1680||1717||Died
|-
|John Colville, 6th Lord Colville of Culross||1717||1741||
|-
|Lord Balmerinoch (1606)||John Elphinstone, 4th Lord Balmerino||1704||1736||
|-
|rowspan=2|Lord Blantyre (1606)||Walter Stuart, 6th Lord Blantyre||1704||1713||Died
|-
|Robert Stuart, 7th Lord Blantyre||1713||1743||
|-
|rowspan=2|Lord Balfour of Burleigh (1607)||Robert Balfour, 4th Lord Balfour of Burleigh||1688||1713||Died
|-
|Robert Balfour, 5th Lord Balfour of Burleigh||1713||1715||Peerage forfeited
|-
|Lord Cranstoun (1609)||William Cranstoun, 5th Lord Cranstoun||1688||1727||
|-
|Lord Dingwall (1609)||James Butler, 3rd Lord Dingwall||1684||1715||Attainted
|-
|rowspan=2|Lord Aston of Forfar (1627)||Walter Aston, 3rd Lord Aston of Forfar||1678||1714||Died
|-
|Walter Aston, 4th Lord Aston of Forfar||1714||1748||
|-
|rowspan=2|Lord Fairfax of Cameron (1627)||Thomas Fairfax, 5th Lord Fairfax of Cameron||1688||1710||Died
|-
|Thomas Fairfax, 6th Lord Fairfax of Cameron||1710||1781||
|-
|Lord Napier (1627)||Francis Napier, 6th Lord Napier||1706||1773||
|-
|Lord Reay (1628)||George Mackay, 3rd Lord Reay||1681||1748||
|-
|rowspan=2|Lord Cramond (1628)||William Richardson, 4th Lord Cramond||1701||1719||Died
|-
|William Richardson, 5th Lord Cramond||1719||1735||
|-
|Lord Forbes of Pitsligo (1633)||Alexander Forbes, 4th Lord Forbes of Pitsligo||1690||1746||
|-
|Lord Kirkcudbright (1633)||James Maclellan, 6th Lord Kirkcudbright||1678||1730||
|-
|Lord Fraser (1633)||Charles Fraser, 4th Lord Fraser||Abt 1680||1720||
|-
|Lord Forrester (1633)||George Forrester, 5th Lord Forrester||1705||1727||
|-
|rowspan=2|Lord Bargany (1641)||William Hamilton, 3rd Lord Bargany||1693||1712||Died
|-
|James Hamilton, 4th Lord Bargany||1712||1736||
|-
|rowspan=3|Lord Banff (1642)||George Ogilvy, 3rd Lord Banff||1668||1713||Died
|-
|George Ogilvy, 4th Lord Banff||1713||1718||
|-
|John George Ogilvy, 5th Lord Banff||1718||1738||
|-
|Lord Elibank (1643)||Alexander Murray, 4th Lord Elibank||1687||1736||
|-
|Lord Falconer of Halkerton (1646)||David Falconer, 3rd Lord Falconer of Halkerton||1684||1724||
|-
|rowspan=2|Lord Belhaven and Stenton (1647)||John Hamilton, 2nd Lord Belhaven and Stenton||1679||1708||Died
|-
|John Hamilton, 3rd Lord Belhaven and Stenton||1708||1721||
|-
|Lord Duffus (1650)||Kenneth Sutherland, 3rd Lord Duffus||1705||1734||
|-
|Lord Rollo (1651)||Robert Rollo, 4th Lord Rollo||1700||1758||
|-
|Lord Ruthven of Freeland (1650)||Jean Ruthven, 3rd Lady Ruthven of Freeland||1701||1722||
|-
|Lord Rutherfurd (1661)||Robert Rutherfurd, 4th Lord Rutherfurd||1685||1724||
|-
|Lord Bellenden (1661)||John Bellenden, 3rd Lord Bellenden||1707||1741||
|-
|Lord Nairne (1681)||William Murray, 2nd Lord Nairne||1683||1716||Attainted
|-
|rowspan=2|Lord Kinnaird (1682)||Patrick Kinnaird, 3rd Lord Kinnaird||1701||1715||Died
|-
|Patrick Kinnaird, 4th Lord Kinnaird||1715||1727||
|-
|colspan=5 style="background: #fcc" align="center"|Peerage of Great Britain
|-
|Baron Harcourt (1711)||Simon Harcourt, 1st Baron Harcourt||1711||1727||New creation
|-
|Baron Hay (1711)||George Hay, 1st Baron Hay||1711||1727||New creation; succeeded to the Earldom of Kinnoull
|-
|Baron Bathurst (1712)||Allen Bathurst, 1st Baron Bathurst||1712||1775||New creation
|-
|Baron Middleton (1712)||Thomas Willoughby, 1st Baron Middleton||1712||1729||New creation
|-
|Baron Foley (1712)||Thomas Foley, 1st Baron Foley||1712||1733||New creation
|-
|Baron Lansdowne (1712)||George Granville, 1st Baron Lansdowne||1712||1735||New creation
|-
|Baron Mansel (1712)||Thomas Mansel, 1st Baron Mansel||1712||1723||New creation
|-
|Baron Trevor (1712)||Thomas Trevor, 1st Baron Trevor||1712||1730||New creation
|-
|Baron Bingley (1713)||Robert Benson, 1st Baron Bingley||1713||1731||New creation
|-
|Baron Carleton (1714)||Henry Boyle, 1st Baron Carleton||1714||1725||New creation
|-
|Baron Parker (1716)||Thomas Parker, 1st Baron Parker||1716||1732||New creation
|-
|rowspan=2|Baron Onslow (1716)||Richard Onslow, 1st Baron Onslow||1716||1717||New creation; died
|-
|Thomas Onslow, 2nd Baron Onslow||1717||1740||
|-
|Baron Torrington (1716)||Thomas Newport, 1st Baron Torrington||1716||1719||New creation; died, title extinct
|-
|Baron Romney (1716)||Robert Marsham, 1st Baron Romney||1716||1724||New creation
|-
|Baron Newburgh (1716)||George Cholmondeley, 1st Baron Newburgh||1716||1733||New creation
|-
|Baron Pawlett of Basing (1717)||Charles Powlett, 1st Baron Pawlett of Basing||1717||1754||New creation
|-
|}

References

 

1707
1700s in England
1700s in Ireland
1700s in Scotland
Peers
Peers
Peers
Peers
Peers
Peers
Peers
18th-century nobility